The RABe 514 is a four-car double decker electrical multiple unit used by the Swiss Federal Railways for the Zürich S-Bahn. It is part of the Siemens Desiro Double Deck product family. The trains are also referred to as DTZ which stands for the German word Doppelstocktriebzug (English: double decker multiple unit).

History 

On 23 February 2003 the Swiss Federal Railways' board of directors decided to give the 447 million CHF contract for building 35 double decker trains to Siemens Transportation Systems. This decision came as a surprise since Siemens had never built double decker EMUs before, except for an experimental train built in a consortium with DWA Görlitz (now Bombardier Transportation) that never entered into service. To fulfill the domestic content requirement in the contract, Siemens reached an agreement with Stadler Rail to perform some of the assembling and the commissioning in their factory in Altenrhein, Switzerland.

The trains were originally intended to enter service in December 2005, but the date could not be kept. Nevertheless, the first trainset was presented to the public on 2 December 2005 at Zürich Hauptbahnhof. Until May of the next year, the RABe 514 were thoroughly tested and then entered into regular passenger service on the S14 line. 

In March 2006 the Swiss Federal Railways exercised their purchase option for another 25 units. Because of the delayed delivery of the first trainsets, Siemens agreed to build an additional train instead of paying a penalty. Delivery of all 61 trains was completed in July 2009.

Accidents and incidents

Specifications 

The DTZ trains are the second generation double decker trains used on the Zürich S-Bahn. Compared to the Re 450, the first generation trains, the RABe 514 feature a low-level entrance for level boarding, air conditioning and vacuum toilets (in a washroom suitable for the disabled).  

The four-car multiple unit consists of two powered end cars with two unpowered cars between them. Both bogies in an end car are driven by induction motors with a power output of 400 kW per axle providing a total of 3200 kW for the trainset. Since there was not enough space for a 15 kV power line through the train, both end cars draw their power from a separate pantograph.

An automatic coupling system allows for up to four trainset to be connected together for additional capacity, however in practice the maximum is three connected trains due to the limited platform lengths of 300 m at the train stations.

Interior 
The double decker trains provide 74 seats in first class, 304 seats in second class as well room for about 600 people standing. The first class seats are equipped with normal 230 V power outlets for charging notebooks and other devices.

Service 

The RABe 514 are used on lines previously served by Re 450. The thereby freed up Re 450 trains were then used to replace the old single deck trains RABDe 510 and RBe 540 from the 1960s. 

The first line served by the new Siemens trains was the S14 (Hinwil–Zürich Hauptbahnhof). Starting in December 2006 the S7 (Rapperswil–Zürich–Winterthur) line was also equipped with the new trains. However all newly delivered trains were first put on the S14 line because that line is better suited for testing due to its short length and lower importance than other lines. After the S7 line got all of its required 15 trainsets, the next trains were intended to go to the S5 line, but that plan was abandoned in favor of the S15 (Affoltern am Albis-Zürich-Rapperswil). With delivery of the second batch, the S8 (Pfäffikon-Zürich-Winterthur) line was equipped as well. S16 (Meilen-Zürich-Thayngen) also use DTZ trains.

The original plan to couple first and second generation trains together to provide level-boarding on more lines could not be implemented due to software problems when connecting the two train generations.

 the RABe 514 is primarily used on five Zürich S-Bahn routes: S2, S6, S8,S16, and S24.

References

External links 

 Manufacturer's website about the RABe 514 (in German)
 Photo gallery of the delivery ceremony of the 60th train 
 General Arrangement and technical leaflet on Manufacturer's website

Double-decker EMUs
Multiple units of Switzerland
Train-related introductions in 2006
15 kV AC multiple units
Siemens multiple units
Stadler Rail multiple units